The Santiago International Film Festival (SANFIC) is a film festival that launched in 2005. As its name suggests, the festival takes place in Santiago, Chile.
 
Along with the well-known Valdivia International Film Festival, SANFIC has become one of the most prestigious film festivals of Chile and South America.

Competition 

There are two main competitions at SANFIC: the Chilean Cinema Competition, and an International Competition, each featuring nine shortlisted films.
There is also a Local Talent competition for local directors and producers, dedicated to short films, with 18 shortlisted works.
 
The judging panel and jury are made up of international and Chilean experts from the film industry.

10th Anniversary edition 

SANFIC 2014 (the 10th edition) took place between the 21 and 26 of October, and screened more than 90 titles from 30 countries, some of which had won prizes at the world's most prestigious film festivals (Cannes, Berlin, Venice and Sundance, among others).

Participating films 

The following films took part in the two competitions:

International Competition 

  Aurora (2014 Film), by Rodrigo Sepulveda (Chile)
 El Ardor, by Pablo Frendik (Argentina, Brazil, Mexico, France, U.S.)
 El Cordero, by Juan Francisco Olea Opera Prima (Chile)
 The Selfish Giant, by Clio Barnard (England)
 Whiplash, by Damien Chazelle (Grand Jury Prize at the Sundance Film Festival; U.S.)
 Finsterworld by Frauke Finsterwalder Opera Prima (Germany)
 Los Ausentes, by Luciana Piantanida (Argentina)
 Ruido Rosa (Pink Noise), by Roberto Flores Prieto (Colombia)
 Un Castillo en Italia (Un Chateau en Italie / A Castle in Italy) by Valeria Bruni Tedeschi, France

Chilean Cinema Competition 

 Escapes de Gas (Gas Leaks), by Bruno Salas
 Genoveva, by Paula Castillo
 Joselito, by Bárbara Pestan
 La comodidad en la distancia (Comfort in the Distance), by Jorge Yacoman
 La Invención de la Patria (The Invention of the Fatherland), by Galut Alarcon
 La Once (Tea Time), by Maite Alberdi
 No soy Lorena (I am not Lorena), by Isidora Marras
 Palabras Cruzadas: Los Amigos de Matta-Clark, by Matías Cardone
 Ventana, by Rodrigo Susarte

Winning films 
The following films won awards at the 10th edition of SANFIC:
 
International Competition
 Best Film: Aurora, by Rodrigo Sepúlveda
 Best Director: Juan Francisco Olea, for El cordero
 Honorable Mention: The Selfish Giant ("El gigante egoísta”), by Clio Barnard
 Honorable Mention:  Whiplash, by Damien Chazelle
Chilean Cinema Competition
 Best Film: La once, by Maite Alberdi
 Best Director: Maite Alberdi, for La once
 Honorable Mention: Escapes de gas, by Bruno Salas
 Honorable Mention:  Genoveva, by Paola Castillo
Audience Award for Best Film
Escapes de gas, by Bruno Salas
Local Talent Competition
 Best Short Film: Historia de un oso, by Gabriel Osorio
 Honorable Mention: Las horas y los siglos, by Nelson Oyarzúa
 Honorable Mention:  Los resentidos, by Pablo Álvarez
Latin American Work in Progress
 La mujer de la esclavina, by Alfonso Gazitúa (Chile)
 Las tetas de mi madre, by Carlos Zapata (Colombia)
 Nunca vas a estar solo, by Álex Anwandter (Chile)
Ventana Sur Prize
 La mujer de la esclavina, by Alfonso Gazitúa (Chile)
Santiago LAB SANFIC Industry Award for documentary projects
(“Premio a proyectos Santiago LAB Documental de SANFIC Industria”)
 Vidas cruzadas, by Paola Castillo
 Honorable Mention: LasFieles, de Valeria Hofmann
 Honorable Mention: El viento sopla donde quiere, by Cristián Saldía
Premio DocsDF:
 Las felicidades del mundo, by Ainara Aparici
 Santiago LAB SANFIC Industry Award for fiction projects
(“Premio a proyectos Santiago LAB Ficción de SANFIC Industria”)
Encuentros Cartagena Prize: El treinticuatro, by Waldo Salgado
Mercado Guadalajara Prize: La Carola, by Juan Francisco Olea
Argentina HD Prize: Cabros de mierda, de Gonzalo Justiniano

See also 

 Aurora (2014 Film)
 Valdivia International Film Festival
 Viña del Mar International Film Festival
 Cinema of Chile

References

External links 
 SANFIC official website
 SANFIC Films on Revius.net
 

Chilean film awards
Film festivals in Chile
Spring (season) events in Chile